Dávid Palásthy (born 10 May 1990) is a professional Hungarian footballer who currently plays for Dunaharaszti MTK.

Club statistics

Updated to games played as of 2 June 2013.

References

External links
 
 HLSZ 

1990 births
Living people
People from Vác
Hungarian footballers
Association football goalkeepers
Vác FC players
Ceglédi VSE footballers
Zalaegerszegi TE players
Egri FC players
Soroksár SC players
III. Kerületi TUE footballers
BKV Előre SC footballers
Dunaharaszti MTK players
Nemzeti Bajnokság I players
Nemzeti Bajnokság II players
Sportspeople from Pest County